The Siemens M55 was a mobile phone which was introduced by Siemens in 2003. At the time it was a high end phone and one of the first colour phones by Siemens, with a 4096 colour screen, Bluetooth and infrared. It had 700mAh battery and no video recorder. Fully charged it could hold around 11 days without charging. These was 2 models of M55; one with orange keyboard and other one with grey.

References

M55
Mobile phones with infrared transmitter